John Wanamaker (July 11, 1838December 12, 1922) was an American merchant and religious, civic and political figure, considered by some to be a proponent of advertising and a "pioneer in marketing". He was born in Philadelphia, Pennsylvania, and served as U.S. Postmaster General during the term of U.S. President Benjamin Harrison from 1889 to 1893.

Early life and family

Wanamaker was born on July 11, 1838, in a then-rural, unincorporated area that would in time come to be known as the Grays Ferry neighborhood of South Philadelphia. His parents were John Nelson Wanamaker, a brickmaker and native of Kingwood, New Jersey, and Elizabeth Deshong Kochersperger, daughter of a farmer and innkeeper at Gray's Ferry. Her ancestors came from Rittershoffen in Alsace, France, and from Canton of Bern in Switzerland. At the age of 19 he was hired by the Philadelphia YMCA, he was the first corresponding secretary in the YMCA movement.

In 1860 John Wanamaker married Mary Erringer Brown (18391920).

They had six children (two died in childhood):
 Thomas Brown Wanamaker (1862–1908), who married Mary Lowber Welch (1864–1929)
 Lewis Rodman Wanamaker (1863–1928), who married Fernanda de Henry and Violet Cruger
 Horace Wanamaker (born 1864, died in infancy during the Civil War)
 Harriett E. "Nettie" Wanamaker (1865–1870)
 Mary Brown "Minnie" Wanamaker (1869–1954), who married Barclay Harding Warburton.
 Elizabeth "Lillie" Wanamaker (1876–1927), who married Norman McLeod

John Wanamaker's son, Thomas B., who specialized in store financial matters, purchased a Philadelphia newspaper called The North American in 1899. He irritated his father by giving regular columns to radical intellectuals, such as single-taxer Henry George, Jr., socialist Henry John Nelson (who later became Emma Goldman's lawyer), and socialist Caroline H. Pemberton. The younger Wanamaker also began publishing a Sunday edition, which offended his father's sense of keeping the Sabbath holy.

His younger son Rodman, a Princeton graduate, lived in France early in his career. He is credited with creating a demand for French luxury goods in Philadelphia and the United States that persists to this day. Rodman was credited with the artistic quality that gave the Wanamaker stores their cachet. He was also a patron of fine music, organizing spectacular organ and orchestra concerts in the Wanamaker Philadelphia and New York stores under music director Alexander Russell.

Department store business

Wanamaker opened his first store in 1861, in partnership with his brother in-law Nathan Brown, called "Oak Hall", at Sixth and Market Streets in Philadelphia, adjacent to the site of George Washington's Presidential home. Oak Hall grew substantially based on Wanamaker's then-revolutionary principle: "One price and goods returnable". In 1869, he opened his second store at 818 Chestnut Street and capitalizing on his own name (due to the untimely death of his brother-in-law) and growing reputation, renamed the company John Wanamaker & Co. In 1875, he purchased an abandoned railroad depot and converted it into a large store, called John Wanamaker & Co. "The Grand Depot". Wanamaker's is considered the first department store in Philadelphia.

Wanamaker Building 
The "Wanamaker Building" is a large, 12-story granite store in Philadelphia, designed by famous Chicago architect Daniel H. Burnham and completed in 1910. It was dedicated by US President William Howard Taft on December 30, 1911. The store stands on the site of "The Grand Depot", encompassing an entire block at the corner of Thirteenth and Market Streets across from Philadelphia's City Hall. The new store, The Wanamaker Building, which still stands today, became a Philadelphia institution. Originally all the space was devoted to the department store and company offices. The building has remained an integral part of the Philadelphia culture. The upper office tower was marketed as the Wanamaker Office Building in 2018.

Grand Court 
The Wanamaker Building's most notable feature is its seven-story, marble-clad central atrium, commonly known as the Grand Court. The Grand Court quickly became a Philadelphia favorite, highlighted by the Wanamaker Eagle and the Wanamaker Grand Court Organ. The Grand Court has been featured in major motion pictures, such as: Nasty Habits (1977), Mannequin (1987), Blow Out (1981), and 12 Monkeys (1995).

Wanamaker Organ 
The Wanamaker Grand Court Organ was designed by George Ashdown Audsley and built by the Los Angeles Art Organ Company for the 1904 St. Louis World's Fair. The instrument had 10,059 pipes, and cost $105,000 to construct, equal to $ today. Wanamaker bought the organ in 1909 and had it transported from St. Louis aboard 13 freight cars. The organ's installation in Philadelphia took two years. It was played for the first time on June 22, 1911, to coincide with England's King George V's coronation.

More than 8,000 pipes were added to the organ between 1911 and 1917. By 1930, an additional 10,000 pipes were installed, bringing the total number of pipes today to 28,750. The instrument is of the American Symphonic school of design, intended to combine traditional organ resources with the tone colors and beauty of the symphony orchestra. Once a year, usually in June, "Wanamaker Organ Day" is held. This free festival lasts most of the day.

Wanamaker Eagle 
John Wanamaker purchased a bronze bird sculpture by August Gaul, following the sculpture's exhibition in America in 1904 at the Louisiana Purchase Exposition. The 2,500-pound sculpture is a focal point of the store's Grand Court. The sculpture is placed above a steel beam because of its weight. Known as the "Wanamaker Eagle", it became a famous meeting place and "Meet me at the Eagle" became a popular Philadelphia catchphrase.

Christmas Light Show 
In November 1955, the store tapped lighting designer, Frederick Yost, to create seasonal displays. Yost designed the Holiday Light Show for the Grand Court, creating a more contemporary display than previous years. Since then the Holiday Light Show has become a beloved annual holiday tradition for generations of Philadelphians. In the 21st century, the light show has been modernized, but has retained the look and feel of the original show. Since 2006 the Macy's Dickens Village has been located on the store's third floor, continuing a cherished Philadelphia Christmas tradition that had begun at Strawbridge's in 1985.

Expansion outside Philadelphia 
Wanamaker expanded to New York City in 1896, continuing a mercantile business originally started by Alexander Turney Stewart. He expanded internationally with the Wanamaker European import houses in London and Paris.

Wanamaker was an innovator, creative in his work, a merchandising genius, and proponent of the power of advertising, though modest and with an enduring reputation for honesty. Although he did not invent the fixed price system, he is credited for the creation of the price tag; he popularized it as the industry standard. He also started the "money-back guarantee" that is now standard business practice.

He provided his employees with free medical care, education, recreational facilities, pensions and profit-sharing plans before such benefits were considered standard. Labor activists, however, knew him as a fierce opponent of unionization. During an 1887 organizing drive by the Knights of Labor, he fired the first twelve union members who were discovered by his detectives.

Wanamaker was the first retailer to place a half-page newspaper ad (1874) and the first full-page ad (1879). He initially wrote his own ad copy, but later hired the world's first full-time copywriter John Emory Powers. During Powers's tenure, Wanamaker's revenues doubled from $4 million to $8 million. Wanamaker supposedly said "Half the money I spend on advertising is wasted; the trouble is I don't know which half."

Postmaster General
In 1889 Wanamaker began the First Penny Savings Bank in order to encourage thrift. That same year he was appointed United States Postmaster General by President Benjamin Harrison; he was accused by the newspapers of the day of buying the post. Wanamaker was credited by his friends with introducing the first commemorative stamp and many efficiencies to the Postal Service. He was the first to make plans for free rural postal service in the United States, although the plan was not implemented until 1896.

In 1890 Wanamaker persuaded Congress to pass an act prohibiting the sale of lottery tickets through the mail, and then he aggressively pursued violators. Those actions effectively ended all state lotteries in the US until they reappeared in 1964, partly as an effort to undermine organized crime.

Wanamaker's tenure at the Post Office was riddled with controversy. He fired some 30,000 postal workers under the then common "spoils system" during his four-year term, as it was customary for a change in political administrations to lead to new appointments for their own supporters. The changeover of so many employees caused severe confusion, inefficiency, and a run-in with civil-service crusader Theodore Roosevelt, a fellow Republican.

In 1890 Wanamaker commissioned a series of stamps that were derided in the national media as the poorest quality stamps ever issued, both for printing quality and materials.  When his department store ordered advance copies of the newly translated novel The Kreutzer Sonata by Leo Tolstoy, the deadline was missed, and only the regular discount was offered by the publisher. He retaliated by banning the book from the US Mail on grounds of obscenity.

He was ridiculed for this action by many major U.S. newspapers. In 1891 he ordered changes in the uniforms of letter carriers, and was accused of arranging for all the uniforms to be ordered from a single firm in Baltimore, to which he was believed to have financial ties. In 1893 he made a public prediction at the Chicago World's Fair that U.S. mail would still rely on stagecoach and horseback delivery for a century to come, failing to anticipate the effects of trains, the automobile, and related truck vehicles.

During World War I, Wanamaker publicly proposed that the United States buy Belgium from Germany for the sum of one-hundred billion dollars, as an alternative to the continuing carnage of the war.

Wanaker was a presidential elector in the 1888 and 1920 presidential elections.

Wanamaker was the longest surviving member of President Benjamin Harrison's cabinet.

Philanthropy 
Wanamaker was known for his philanthropy to programs to aid the poor in Philadelphia.  He co-founded Sunday Breakfast Rescue Mission, a homeless shelter and soup kitchen, in 1878. The Sunday Breakfast Rescue Mission has since expanded to provide more services and still supports the homeless population of Philadelphia.

Wanamaker was an avid collector of art and antiquities. He made several donations to the University of Pennsylvania Museum of Archaeology and Anthropology. Among these donations was a collection of bronze reproductions of artifacts uncovered from the ruins of Pompeii and Herculaneum, which Wanamaker had commissioned by the Chiurazzi Foundry in Naples specifically for the museum. They are known collectively as the Wanamaker Bronzes.

Death

He died on December 12, 1922. His funeral was on December 14, 1922, with a service at the Bethany Presbyterian Church.  He was interred in the Wanamaker family tomb in the churchyard of the Church of St. James the Less in Philadelphia.

At his death his estate was estimated to be US$100 million ($ today), divided equally among his three living children and granddaughters, Mary "Minnie" Wanamaker Warburton (Mrs. Barclay Warburton), Patricia "Paddy" W. Estelle, and Elizabeth Wanamaker McLeod, who all received substantial stock, real estate and cash instruments. Second son Rodman was made sole inheritor of the store businesses. Rodman died in 1928, leaving the businesses with a documented worth of $36.7 million ($ today) in a trust. Rodman Wanamaker is credited with founding the Professional Golfers' Association of America and the Millrose Games. The senior Wanamaker's first son, Thomas B. Wanamaker, died in Paris in 1908.

He was the last surviving Cabinet member of the Harrison administration.

Legacy

His country estate was the Lindenhurst mansion in Cheltenham Township, Pennsylvania, which stood on York Road, below Washington Lane. The original mansion was designed by architect E. A. Sargent of New York; President Harrison visited there. A neoclassic mansion was constructed when the original Victorian Lindenhurst burned in 1907, destroying much of Wanamaker's art collection. A railroad station, Chelten Hills (located below Jenkintown, and no longer in existence), was constructed on the property in addition to his vast mansion. The campus of Salus University is today on part of the former estate.

A family trust owned the Wanamaker's store chain, run by a trustee system set up by Rodman Wanamaker's will. In 1978 the business was sold to Carter Hawley Hale, Inc. The 15-store chain was sold to Woodward & Lothrop in 1986, and the downtown store was renamed as Lord & Taylor. Woodies declared bankruptcy in 1994, and with it went the Wanamaker stores, which were sold to May Department Stores Company on June 21, 1995. In August 2006 the flagship Philadelphia store was converted from a Lord & Taylor to a Macy's.

 Bronze busts honoring Wanamaker and other industry magnates stand between the Chicago River and the Merchandise Mart in downtown Chicago, Illinois.
 A popular saying illustrating how difficult it was to quantify the response to advertising is attributed to Wanamaker: "Half the money I spend on advertising is wasted; the trouble is I don't know which half."
 Beginning in 1908, Wanamaker financed Anna Jarvis's campaign to have a national Mother's Day holiday officially recognized. On May 8, 1914, the U.S. Congress passed a law designating the second Sunday in May as Mother's Day, which also later became an international holiday. A dedicated Pennsylvania historic marker honoring Jarvis and Wananmaker is located at Philadelphia City Hall, across the street from Wanamaker's store, where the earliest Mother's Day ceremonies were held.
 Wanamaker's fame was considerable around the world in his heyday.  In the original play Pygmalion (1912) by George Bernard Shaw, Alfred Doolittle is left a legacy by an American philanthropist millionaire named "Ezra Wanafeller", combining Wanamaker's name with John D. Rockefeller, Sr.
 John Wanamaker owned homes in Philadelphia, Cape May Point and Bay Head, New Jersey, New York City, Florida, London, Paris, and Biarritz. He had a townhouse at 2032 Walnut Street in Philadelphia, which was designed similar to an English manor house and held a Welte Philharmonic Organ. He died in this residence. The facade of this building is still extant. During the 1980 construction of the new Wanamaker House high rise on the adjacent property on Walnut Street, the facade of the original Wanamaker house was closely monitored to ensure its preservation. This monitoring was performed by the Engineering firm, Boucher and James, Inc. Dale Leonard, professional land surveyor. Thomas Edison, a close friend, was an honorary pallbearer at his funeral (there were 150 of them).
 John Wanamaker was instrumental in the foundation of the Williamson College of the Trades (originally, 'Williamson Free School of Mechanical Trades') in Elwyn, PA. It was named for his friend and mentor, Isaiah Vansant Williamson. Williamson died in 1889, shortly after he founded the school. Wanamaker was the chairman of the school's first board of trustees, who realized Williamson's vision and planning for the school. The board held a competition for the design of the original campus buildings and selected famed Philadelphia architect, Frank Furness (Furness, Evans & Company). Wanamaker has been memorialized in many ways at the school, most conspicuously in The John Wanamaker Free School of Artisans, which encompasses the instructional trade workshops and is considered the heart of the college. A dormitory, foundations, and groups are also named in his honor. Wanamaker privately wrote a biography of Williamson titled, Life of Isaiah V. Williamson, which was published posthumously in 1928.
 John Wanamaker was a Pennsylvania Mason. The John Wanamaker Masonic Humanitarian Medal  was created by resolution of the Grand Lodge of Pennsylvania at the December Quarterly Communication of 1993. The medal, also called "The Wanamaker Medal" is to be awarded to a person (male or female) who, being a non-Mason, supports the ideals and philosophy of the Masonic Fraternity.  At the discretion of the R. W. Grand Master, the medal is awarded to one who personifies the high ideals of John Wanamaker–a public spirited citizen, a lover of all people, and devoted to doing good. The medal has been presented sparingly to maintain the great prestige associated with an award created by resolution of the Pennsylvania Grand Lodge.
 John Wanamaker was instrumental in the vision and planning of the Benjamin Franklin Parkway in Philadelphia.

See also

 Luther Standing Bear
 Owney (dog)
The Book News Monthly
 Timothy Eaton
 Wanamaker Organ
 Wanamaker's Department Store
 1899 United States Senate election in Pennsylvania

References

Further reading
  (children's biography)

External links

 John Wanamaker: A retailing innovator
 Who Made America? (John Wanamaker, Innovator)
 Advertising Hall of Fame
 A Short Life of John Wanamaker
 
 
 
 

1838 births
1922 deaths
19th-century American businesspeople
19th-century American politicians
American businesspeople in retailing
American people of German descent
American people of Swiss descent
Benjamin Harrison administration cabinet members
Burials at the Church of St. James the Less
Businesspeople from Philadelphia
Pennsylvania Republicans
People from Bay Head, New Jersey
People from Cape May Point, New Jersey
People from Cheltenham, Pennsylvania
Retail company founders
United States Postmasters General
Wanamaker family
1888 United States presidential electors
1920 United States presidential electors